The Best of Jim Reeves Volume III is a compilation album by Jim Reeves, released in 1969 on RCA Victor.

Track listing

Charts

References 

1969 compilation albums
Jim Reeves albums
RCA Victor compilation albums